The Rue Greffulhe is a street in the 8th arrondissement of Paris, France. It was named after Count Louis-Charles Greffulhe, who was the owner of the land prior to its construction in 1839. Composer Georges Hugon lived at number 5 while Reynaldo Hahn lived at number 7.

References

1839 establishments in France